The 1998–99 Iraq FA Cup was the 22nd edition of the Iraq FA Cup as a clubs-only competition. The tournament was won by Al-Zawraa for the second time in a row and for the 13th time in their history, beating Al-Talaba 1–0 after extra time in the final with a golden goal by Mohamed Jassim. Al-Zawraa also won the 1998–99 Iraqi Premier League to complete the double.

On 14 December 1998, Al-Shorta broke the record for the most goals scored in a single half of a match in Iraqi football, putting 10 goals past Al-Bahri in the first 45 minutes as the game ended 10–1. Hashim Ridha and Arkan Mahmoud both scored hat-tricks while Younis Abid Ali scored a brace and Abdul-Hussein Jawad and Qais Issa scored one each. Hashim Ridha's total of 14 goals in the competition is a record for the most goals scored by a player in an Iraq FA Cup tournament.

Bracket

First preliminary round

Second preliminary round

Final phase

Matches

Quarter-finals

First legs

Second legs 

Al-Quwa Al-Jawiya won 5–1 on aggregate.

Al-Zawraa won 7–4 on aggregate.

Al-Talaba won 2–1 on aggregate.

Al-Shorta won 3–1 on aggregate.

Semi-finals

First legs

Second legs 

Al-Zawraa won 6–4 on aggregate.

Al-Talaba won 5–0 on aggregate.

Final

References

External links
 Iraqi Football Website

Iraq FA Cup
Cup